Pecado Capital is a Brazilian telenovela produced and broadcast by TV Globo. It premiered on 24 November 1975 and ended on 4 June 1976, with a total of 167 episodes. It's the sixteenth "novela das oito" to be aired on the timeslot. It is created and written by Janete Clair and directed by Daniel Filho and Jardel Mello.

Cast 
 Francisco Cuoco as Carlão (José Carlos Moreno)
 Betty Faria as Lucinha (Maria Lúcia Batista / Lucy Jordan)
 Lima Duarte as Salviano Lisboa
 Rosamaria Murtinho as Eunice Saraiva
 Débora Duarte as Vilminha (Vilma Lisboa)
 Dênis Carvalho as Nélio Porto Rico
 Theresa Amayo as Vitória Lisboa
 Luiz Armando Queiroz as Vicente Lisboa
 Emiliano Queiroz as Valdir
 Gilberto Martinho as Raimundo
 Sandra Barsotti as Gigi
 Elizângela as Emilene Batista
 Germano Filho as Orestes Batista
 Ilva Niño as Alzira Batista
 Lutero Luiz as Marciano
 Milton Gonçalves as Dr. Percival Garcia
 Mário Lago as Dr. Peres
 Marco Nanini as Vinícius Lisboa
 João Carlos Barroso as Valter Lisboa
 Malu Rocha as Cibele Lisboa
 Lauro Góes as Virgílio Lisboa
 Dary Reis as Hernani
 Elza Gomes as Bá
 Maria Pompeu as Djanira
 Miriam Pires as Nora
 Moacyr Deriquém as Ricardo Saraiva
 Regina Duarte as Mila
 Nestor de Montemar as Roger
 Leina Krespi as Elizeth
 Lady Francisco as Rose
 André Valli as Claudius
 Fábio Mássimo as Paulo Roberto (Paulinho)
 Heloísa Helena as Hortência
 Ivan Cândido as Dr. Coutinho
 Fernando José as Dr. Altino
 Alfredo Murphy as Sandoval
 Gilson Moura as Jurandir
 Zanoni Ferrite as Miguel
 Isolda Cresta as Mafalda Lisboa
 Glória Ladany as Aurora
 Juan Daniel as Juan Daniel
 Darcy de Souza as D. Júlia
 José de Arimathéa as Dr. Machado
 Cidinha Milan as Maria de Lourdes
 Hemílcio Fróes as Dr. Noronha
 José Maria Monteiro as Noel
 Daisy Machado as Zilda
 Georgiana de Moraes as Claudinha
 Hélio Fernando as César
 Átila Ventura as Jaime
 Hortênsia Tayer as Vera
 Leda Borba as Judite
 Luís Felipe Vasconcellos as Lucas

References

External links 
 

Brazilian telenovelas
1975 telenovelas
TV Globo telenovelas
1975 Brazilian television series debuts
1976 Brazilian television series endings
Portuguese-language telenovelas
Robbery in television